List of current production certified light aircraft for general aviation

References 

Aircraft by type
General aviation
Lists of aircraft by design configuration